Olie James Cordill (April 28, 1916November 14, 1988) was a professional American football halfback in the National Football League. A 1st round selection (5th overall pick) in the 1940 NFL Draft out of Rice University, Cordill played for the Cleveland Rams in that year.

External links

1916 births
1988 deaths
People from Big Spring, Texas
Players of American football from Texas
American football halfbacks
Rice Owls football players
Cleveland Rams players
United States Army Air Forces personnel of World War II
United States Army Air Forces officers
Military personnel from Texas